Fatal System Error (2010) is a book by Joseph Menn, an investigative technology reporter at The Washington Post, and previously with Reuters, the Financial Times and Los Angeles Times.

The book investigates the espionage network of international mobsters and hackers who use the Internet to extort money from businesses, steal from tens of millions of consumers, and attack government networks.

The main focus of the book is on Barrett Lyon and Andy Crocker and the capture of cybercriminals Ivan Maksakov, Alexander Petrov, and Denis Stepanov.

References

External links 
 
 STAYING SAFER ONLINE
PublicAffairs Books
Interview with Joseph Menn WNYC
Fighting Cybercrime, One Digital Thug At A Time NPR

2010 non-fiction books